Chad Archibald (born 30 July 1981) is a Canadian film, television and music video producer and director.

Filmography

Film 
BootyMeat 5000 (2003)
Desperate Souls (2005)
Neverlost (2011)
Kill (2011)
The Drownsman (2014)
Ejecta (2014)
Bite (2015)
The Heretics (2017)
I'll Take your dead (2019)

Television 
Creepy Canada (2006, 2 episodes)

References

External links
 
 

Living people
Canadian film directors
Canadian music video directors
1981 births